The 1998 Asian Men's Junior Handball Championship (6th tournament) took place in Manama from 25 August–8 September. It acts as the Asian qualifying tournament for the 1999 Men's Junior World Handball Championship.

Draw

Preliminary round

Group A

Group B

Final round

Semifinals

Bronze medal match

Gold medal match

Final standing

References
www.handball.jp (Archived 2009-09-04)

H
Hand
Asia
Asian Handball Championships